Setiarcha is a genus of moths belonging to the family Tineidae. It contains only one species, Setiarcha aleuropis, which is found in Brazil.

References

Tineidae
Monotypic moth genera
Moths of South America
Taxa named by Edward Meyrick
Tineidae genera